The Wilmington Sharks are an American baseball team in the East Division of the Coastal Plain League (CPL), a collegiate summer baseball league. The Sharks play their home games at Buck Hardee Field at Legion Stadium in Wilmington, North Carolina.  Buck Hardee Field is more commonly referred to as "The Shark Tank."

The Sharks were founded in 1997 as a pioneer member of the Coastal Plain League. They have played in every CPL season except 2020, winning the Petitt Cup in 1998 and 1999.

On Tuesday, March 2, 2017, National Sports Service acquired the team from the Smith Family Baseball Wilmington, LLC, which had been the owners since 2014. The 2017 season was the Sharks’ 20th season in Wilmington.

The Coastal Plain League announced on Tuesday, September 3, 2019 that the Sharks were named the 2019 Coastal Plain League Organization of the Year.

On Monday, March 29, 2021, the Sharks announced Allan Lusk as the new General Manager of the Sharks. Lusk brings nine years of Minor League Baseball experience to the Sharks, most recently with the Biloxi Shuckers, Double-A affiliate of the Milwaukee Brewers.  He spent six years with the Shuckers while playing a key role in the development and creation of the new franchise and the opening of the Shuckers’ new stadium, MGM Park.  He also spent time with the Kinston Indians (former High-A affiliate of the Cleveland Indians), the Corpus Christi Hooks (Double-A affiliate of the Houston Astros), and the Bowling Green Hot Rods (Class A affiliate of the Tampa Bay Rays).

Sharky, an anthropomorphic gray shark, is the Sharks' mascot.

Recent seasons
The 2018 season, the Sharks finished with a 17-34 record and finished in last place. Average attendance in 2018 was 1,001. It was the Sharks first losing season since 2014.

In the 2019 season, the Sharks slightly improved to a 20-31 record, finishing in 13th place and missing the Petitt Cup playoffs.  Average attendance in 2019 was 1,105.

For the 2020 season, the CPL had planned to return to a two-division format, placing the Sharks in the East Division.  The 2020 season was originally slated to begin on May 28.  Due to COVID-19 restrictions, CPL postponed its opening day to July 1. In response to the pandemic and the attendant restrictions, the Sharks opted not to play the 2020 season.  (The CPL played a shortened season.)  The Sharks plan to return to the CPL in the 2021 season, in the East Division.

2021 season
In expanding their player roster and creating a split squad, the Sharks will host 34 home games, a 30% increase in home dates compared to the 2019 season. The Sharks will also play 22 road games as part of the CPL regular season schedule. The 2021 season kicks off on Thursday, May 27 as the Sharks host the Morehead City Marlins, and concludes on Saturday, July 31 with a road game against the Florence RedWolves.   The CPL playoffs begin immediately following the regular season.

Beyond Coastal Plain League games, the Sharks schedule will be sprinkled throughout with home games against teams from the Tidewater Collegiate League and the Myrtle Beach Ripken Collegiate Summer League.

Coaching staff
Russ Burroughs will return as Sharks field manager for his debut at the helm of the team after the cancellation of the 2020 season. The 2021 season marks Burrough’s first in Wilmington and fourth in the CPL as he served the Edenton Steamers as a pitching coach in 2017 before being named manager in 2018 and 2019. Burroughs’ previous clubs have produced 10 CPL All-Stars, six players who have signed professional contracts, four players represented in the NCAA College World Series and seven All-CPL 1st and 2nd team honorees.

Austin Turner joins the Sharks as an assistant coach after his first season as an assistant coach at John A. Logan Community College in Carterville, Illinois. Turner, an alumnus of Alabama A&M University and former All-SWAC Academic Honoree previously served as the volunteer assistant at his alma mater coaching infielders and hitters among other duties. Prior to coaching collegiately, Turner operated a training academy in Huntsville which consisted of over 10 teams.

Tyler Fitzgerald will serve as an assistant coach to the Sharks after spending the 2020-2021 off-season as pitching coordinator for Vikings Baseball in Massachusetts where he has worked extensively with pitchers from the youth, college and professional levels. The alumnus of Keene State College and Southern New Hampshire University pitched in varying roles through his collegiate career with summer collegiate stops with the Vermont Mountaineers of the New England Collegiate Baseball League and North Shore Navigators of the Futures Summer Collegiate Baseball league. Fitzgerald is currently completing his Masters of Business Administration in Business Analytics.

Uniforms

The Sharks' colors are white, navy blue, and light blue.  Their standard home uniform is a white jersey and white pants with navy and light blue trim, with SHARKS printed in stylized block font across the front.  Other uniforms include white pants with a light blue jersey having the Sharks logo on the left breast, and white pants with a navy blue jersey having WILMINGTON printed across the front.

They wear two caps: one mostly navy blue except for a light blue bill and the other entirely navy blue.  The Sharks logo is on the front of both caps.

Yearly records

Alumni
 Tom Mastny (2002); pitcher, Cleveland Indians (2006–2008)
 Alec Bohm (2016); 3B, Philadelphia Phillies (2020-present)

References

External links
 Official Site
 Coastal Plain League

Coastal Plain League
Sports in Wilmington, North Carolina
1997 establishments in North Carolina
Baseball teams established in 1997
Amateur baseball teams in North Carolina